Ap Tan Pai is a reef in the New Territories of Hong Kong. It is located in Ap Chau Bay (Ap Chau Hoi) of Crooked Harbour, between Ap Chau to the east and Ap Lo Chun to the southwest. It is under the administration of North District.

References

Uninhabited islands of Hong Kong
North District, Hong Kong
Islands of Hong Kong